Eramosa may refer to:

 Guelph/Eramosa, Ontario, a township in Wellington County, Ontario, Canada
 Eramosa, a Silurian stratigraphic unit along the Niagara Escarpment in Ontario and western New York State
Eramosa marble, a building stone obtained from this source
 Eramosa Karst, an officially designated Area of Natural and Scientific Interest in Stoney Creek, Ontario
 Eramosa River, a river in Wellington County, Ontario